The 2002–03 Maltese Premier League was the 23rd season of the Maltese Premier League, and the 88th season of top-tier football in Malta. The league started on 24 August 2002 and finished on 11 May 2003. Hibernians were the defending champions.

Teams 

The following teams were promoted from the First Division at the start of the season:
 Marsaxlokk
 Mosta

From the previous Premier League season, the following teams were relegated to the First Division:
 Naxxar Lions
 Lija Athletic

First phase

League table

Results

Second phase

Top Six 

The teams placed in the first six positions in the league table qualified for the Top Six, and the points obtained during the first phase were halved (and rounded up) before the start of second phase. As a result, the teams started with the following points before the second phase: Sliema Wanderers 22 points, Birkirkara 20, Valletta 19, Hibernians 15, Pietà Hotspurs 12 and Marsaxlokk 11.

Play-out 

The teams which finished in the last four league positions were placed in the play-out and at the end of the phase the two lowest-placed teams were relegated to the First Division. The points obtained during the first phase were halved (and rounded up) before the start of second phase. As a result, the teams started with the following points before the second phase: Floriana 10 points, Ħamrun Spartans 9, Marsa 8 and Mosta 5.

Season statistics

Top scorers

Hat-tricks

References

External links 
 Official website

Maltese Premier League seasons
Malta
1